The Public Health Service Act is a United States federal law enacted in 1944. The full act is codified in Title 42 of the United States Code (The Public Health and Welfare), Chapter 6A (Public Health Service).

Contents

The Public Health Service Act of 1944 provided a legislative basis for the provision of public health services in the United States. However, health services in the US subsequently have been marked by a history of underinvestment that has undermined the public health workforce and support for population health.   

The act clearly established the federal government's quarantine authority for the first time. It gave the United States Public Health Service responsibility for preventing the introduction, transmission and spread of communicable diseases from foreign countries into the United States.

The Public Health Service Act granted the original authority for scientists and special consultants to be appointed "without regard to the civil-service laws", known as a Title 42 appointment.

During COVID-19 pandemic, section  has been used for Title 42 expulsion.

Amendments
It has since been amended many times. Some of these amendments are:
Family Planning Services and Population Research Act of 1970 , which established Title X of the Public Health Service Act, dedicated to providing family planning services for those in need.
National Cancer Act of 1971
Health Insurance Portability and Accountability Act of 1996
Health Center Consolidation Act of 1996
National Institute of Biomedical Imaging and Bioengineering Establishment Act of 2000
Muscular Dystrophy Community Assistance Research and Education Amendments of 2001
Hematological Cancer Research Investment and Education Act of 2001
Newborn Screening Saves Lives Act of 2007
Patient Protection and Affordable Care Act of 2010
Pandemic and All-Hazards Preparedness Reauthorization Act of 2013 (H.R. 307; 113th Congress)
Suicide Training and Awareness Nationally Delivered for Universal Prevention Act of 2021 (S. 1543; 117th Congress)

Proposed amendments 
Other attempted amendments to the act have bee proposed but failed:

 Stem Cell Research Enhancement Acts of 2005 and 2007
 115TH CONGRESS 1ST SESSION H. R. 708 To amend title XXVII of the Public Health Service Act to change the permissible age variation in health insurance premium rates.
One proposal to amend the Public Health Service Act is the Veteran Emergency Medical Technician Support Act of 2013, a bill in the 113th United States Congress.  The bill was introduced on January 14, 2013 by Rep. Adam Kinzinger (R-IL).   It passed the United States House of Representatives on February 12, 2013 by a voice vote, indicating that it was generally non-controversial.  The Bill would amend the Public Health Service Act to direct the Secretary of Health and Human Services (HHS) to establish a demonstration program for states with a shortage of emergency medical technicians (EMTs) to streamline state requirements and procedures to assist veterans who completed military EMT training while serving in the Armed Forces to meet state EMT certification, licensure, and other requirements.  The bill still needs to pass in the United States Senate and be signed by the President of the United States before it would become law.
The Children's Hospital GME Support Reauthorization Act of 2013 (H.R. 297; 113th Congress) is a bill in the 113th United States Congress that would amend the Public Health Service Act to extend and reauthorize appropriations for payments to children's hospitals for expenses associated with operating approved graduate medical residency training programs.  The portion of the Public Health Service Act that would be amended is Section 340E (42 U.S.C. 256e).  The amendment would cover Fiscal Years 2013 - 2017.  H.R. 297 passed the United States House of Representatives with a vote of 352-50 on February 4, 2013 (Roll no. 32).
Emergency Medical Services for Children Reauthorization Act of 2014 (S. 2154; 113th Congress) is a bill in the 113th United States Congress that would amend the Public Health Service Act to reauthorize the Emergency Medical Services for Children Program through FY2019.

References

External links
 Current version of the Public Health Service Act, as codified from the Legal Information Institute
 Original uncodified bill, as amended (8/5/2009)
 

1944 in law
United States federal health legislation
United States Public Health Service
Pharmaceutical regulation in the United States